Acalolepta sculpturata is a species of beetle in the family Cerambycidae. It was described by Per Olof Christopher Aurivillius in 1924. It is known from Java.

References

Acalolepta
Beetles described in 1924